The Andy Stewart Show was a British television series which aired from 1975 to 1976. Aired on Scottish Television, all 26 episodes are missing, believed lost.

References

External links
 The Andy Stewart Show on IMDb

1975 Scottish television series debuts
1976 Scottish television series endings
1970s Scottish television series
Lost television shows
Television shows produced by Scottish Television
English-language television shows